Hai Bangalore is a mass circulation weekly Kannada language tabloid published in Bangalore. It was founded by Ravi Belagere along with R. T. Vittalamurthy, MaSuri, & Jogi  in 1995 which he published from his Padmanabhanagar office in Bengaluru. The columns like Love Lavike, Bottom Item and Khaas Baat apart from Papigala Lokadalli which was about the underworld, created many admirers and his paper was the most-circulated newspaper over the five years. The tabloid articles include reports about scandals, scams, affairs, background politics, murders, crime to the public eye, although the accuracy of the reports is often questionable. Apart from these reports, it contains columns and articles about various fields like psychology, sports, science and cinema news.

In 2003, its coverage accounted for 13 of the 46 complaints investigated by a Press Council of India inquiry into defamatory and damaging journalism in the southern states of India.

Sister publications
O Manase, a fortnightly Kannada language youth magazine

See also
 List of Kannada-language newspapers
 List of Kannada-language magazines
 List of newspapers in India
 Media in Karnataka
 Media of India

References

Mass media in Bangalore
Newspapers published in Bangalore
Kannada-language newspapers
1995 establishments in Karnataka
Publications established in 1995